Kaeng khae is a curry of northern Thai cuisine.

The curry is named after the Piper sarmentosum leaves, one of its main ingredients, which are known as phak khae in northern Thailand.

Ingredients
This curry is made mainly with vegetables and herbs. Chicken, frogs, beef, dried fish or snails are added depending on the variant.

The ingredients of the dish are P. sarmentosum, Lao coriander, cha-om, and Acmella oleracea leaves, the dry cores of the Bombax ceiba flower, Sesbania grandiflora flowers, ivy gourds, eggplants, bamboo shoots, pea eggplants, fresh chilies, and mushrooms. 

Khua khae is a curry that is similar to kaeng khae, but less liquid.

See also 
 List of Thai dishes
 Thai curry

References

External links
Wiang Sa Local Food - Kaeng Khae
Lanna Food

Northern Thai cuisine